Gold Reef City is an amusement park in Johannesburg, South Africa. Located on an old gold mine which closed in 1971, the park is themed around the gold rush that started in 1886 on the Witwatersrand, the buildings on the park are designed to mimic the same period. There is a museum dedicated to gold mining on the grounds where it is possible to see a gold-containing ore vein and see how gold is poured into barrels. And multiple shops around the park can be located.

There are many attractions at Gold Reef City, including water rides, roller coasters and the famous Gold Reef City Casino. Gold Reef City is located to the south of the Central Business District off of the M1. It is also the site of the Apartheid Museum.

Rides and attractions

Some of the popular rides at the theme park include:

 The Anaconda, the world's only Giovanola inverted coaster.
 Golden Loop, originally White Lightnin' at Carowinds. It is a Schwarzkopf Shuttle Loop.
 Jozi Express, a high-speed roller coaster built and manufactured by the German amusement park ride manufacturer Zierer.
 Miner's Revenge
 Raging River Rapids
 Runaway Train
 Storm Chaser
 The High Flying Maverick
 Tower of Terror, a high-speed rollercoaster with a vertical drop into an old mineshaft and the highest g force on any roller coaster at 6.3 gs.
 UFO, a giant wheel that spins at high speed while being lifted from a horizontal position to a near-60 degree position.
 Giant Wheel, a Ferris wheel

Potential flooding
It was reported in 2013 that acidic mine water was slowly rising within the mine on which the park is built and that there was a possibility of the park being flooded if left unattended. Mine tours were temporarily halted, and the museum was moved from  215m underground to 80m above ground.

Photo gallery

References

External links

 Official Website

Tourist attractions in Johannesburg
Amusement parks in South Africa
Buildings and structures in Johannesburg
Culture of Johannesburg